Mohammad Nasuha (born 15 September 1984 in Serang) is an Indonesian former footballer who last played for Cilegon United and the Indonesia national football team. Before played for Persib, he played for Persikota, Sriwijaya and Persija

International career
Nasuha made his debut in international friendly match against Singapore on November 4, 2009 as substitute player. Then, he was called up by Alfred Riedl to participate in the 2010 AFF Suzuki Cup. He played in every match and scored his first international goal for Indonesia in the second leg final against Malaysia. Indonesia won the match 2-1 but didn't win the cup as they were beaten 3-0 in the first leg. His second goal was scored during the second leg of the second round of 2014 World Cup qualification versus Turkmenistan.

International goals

Honours

Club honors
Sriwijaya
Piala Indonesia : 2008–09, 2010
Cilegon United
Liga Indonesia First Division : 2014

References

1984 births
Living people
Sportspeople from Banten
Indonesian footballers
Association football defenders
Indonesia international footballers
Pelita Jaya FC players
Persikota Tangerang players
Sriwijaya F.C. players
Persija Jakarta players
Persib Bandung players
People from Serang
Cilegon United players